Scott Bradley may refer to:

 Scott Bradley (composer) (1891–1977), American composer, pianist, and conductor
 Scott Bradley (baseball) (born 1960), American baseball catcher
 Scott Bradley (politician) (born 1952), American politician and university administrator from Utah
 Scott Bradley (racing driver) (born 1976), American racing driver

See also
Scott Bradlee (born 1981), American musician